Proclamation 4483, also known as the Granting Pardon for Violations of the Selective Service Act, was a presidential proclamation issued by Jimmy Carter in 1977. It granted pardons to those who evaded the draft in the Vietnam War by violating the Military Selective Service Act from August 4, 1964, to March 28, 1973. It was implemented through Executive Order 11967.

Context
During the Vietnam War, hundreds of thousands of American men evaded the draft by fleeing the country or failing to register with their local draft board. President Gerald Ford signed a proclamation in 1974 that granted conditional amnesty to draft evaders, provided they work in a public service job for up to two years. Those who had evaded the draft by leaving the country were not eligible for a conditional pardon. Up to 90% of evaders had fled to Canada, with up to 50,000 settling there permanently.

Jimmy Carter promised during his presidential campaign that he would pardon draft evaders of the Vietnam War, calling it the "single hardest decision" of his campaign. He signed the proclamation on January 21, 1977, his first full day in office. The proclamation did not offer amnesty to deserters, however.

Reception
Barry Goldwater, a supporter of the Vietnam War, referred to the proclamation as "the most disgraceful thing that a president has ever done". Carter was accused of showing favoritism towards middle-class evaders who were able to successfully stay out of the war. Some Vietnam veterans were opposed to amnesty for evaders, while anti-war activists said it fell short by not pardoning deserters.

References

Presidency of Jimmy Carter
1977 in the United States